Thorpe in Balne is a civil parish in the metropolitan borough of Doncaster, South Yorkshire, England.  The parish contains three listed buildings that are recorded in the National Heritage List for England.  Of these, one is listed at Grade II*, the middle of the three grades, and the others are at Grade II, the lowest grade.  The parish contains the village of Thorpe in Balne, and is otherwise rural.  The listed buildings consist of the remains of a chapel incorporated in farm buildings, a farmhouse, and a barn.


Key

Buildings

References

Citations

Sources

 

Lists of listed buildings in South Yorkshire
Buildings and structures in the Metropolitan Borough of Doncaster